The Three Jovial Huntsmen (1880) was a popular British picture book illustrated by Randolph Caldecott, engraved and printed by Edmund Evans and published by George Routledge & Sons in London. The toy book, which is a variant of the folklore song The Three Huntsmen (sometimes called the Three Jolly Huntsmen), was well-received, selling tens of thousands of copies.

The three droll equestrians featured in the book are featured  as the logo of the Horn Book Magazine. In 1914, four colour pictures from the book were reproduced by Frederick Warne & Co as postcards.

The story was also noted for using the word "powlert" which was not defined ineither The New English or The Century dictionaries.

Postcards

References

Sources
Journals

External links
 LOC
 Archive.org Book

1880 books
1880s children's books
British picture books
Routledge books
English nursery rhymes
British children's books
English folk songs
English children's songs
Traditional children's songs